M. Mathiventhan is an Indian politician and doctor from Rasipuram, Tamilnadu. He is a member of DMK party, who was elected as the Member of the Legislative Assembly for Rasipuram constituency in 2021. He is the current Minister for Forests of the state.

Family
Manthiventhan's father is Mayavan. He is married to Sivaranjini Mathiventhan. The couple have a daughter. They live in Rasipuram.

Occupation
Mathiventhan has held MBBS and MD degrees in allopathic medicine. He is working at own dispensary clinic in Rasipuram Town.

Politics
He defeated former Minister V.Saroja in the Rasipuram assembly constituency of Namakkal district in the 2021 Tamil Nadu assembly elections and was elected as a member of the assembly for DMK party. He subsequently became the Minister of Tourism Development on May 7, 2021.
 He was re-designated as the Minister for Forests following a cabinet reshuffle on 14 December 2022.

References

Living people
Dravida Munnetra Kazhagam politicians
Tamil Nadu MLAs 2021–2026
Tamil Nadu ministers
Year of birth missing (living people)